Inhuman is the fourth album by death metal band Desecration, though the band considers it their first properly released album.

Track listing
 "Insane Savagery"
 "Turning Black"
 "Dig Up, Dig In"
 "Asphyxiate on Blood"
 "Life Of Gore"
 "Inhuman"
 "Another Obscene Publication"
 "Death You'll Face"
 "Killer Row"
 "A Message to the Censor"

2000 albums
Desecration (band) albums